The 1853 California gubernatorial election was held on September 7, 1853, to elect the governor of California. Incumbent governor John Bigler successfully ran for reelection, winning over Whig nominee William Waldo in a close race.

Results

References

1853
California
gubernatorial
September 1853 events